Maria Edera Spadoni (born 28 July 1979) is an Italian politician from the Five Star Movement. She has been a member of the Chamber of Deputies from 2013 to 2022.

Biography 
Spadoni was born in Montecchio Emilia and graduated from the University of Bologna before working as a flight attendant.

See also 

 List of members of the Italian Chamber of Deputies, 2013–2018
 List of members of the Italian Chamber of Deputies, 2018–2022

References 

1979 births
Living people
Flight attendants
University of Bologna alumni
21st-century Italian women politicians
21st-century Italian politicians
Five Star Movement politicians
Deputies of Legislature XVII of Italy
Deputies of Legislature XVIII of Italy
People from Emilia-Romagna
Vice presidents of the Chamber of Deputies (Italy)
Women members of the Chamber of Deputies (Italy)